Orlando Smeekes (born 28 December 1981) is a Curaçaoan former professional footballer who played as a winger.

Club career 
Smeekes was born in Amsterdam, Netherlands. On 10 September 2008, he left Go Ahead Eagles and moved to German 3. Liga club Stuttgarter Kickers. After the relegation of Kickers he signed with FC Carl Zeiss Jena on 26 June 2009. In July 2010 joined for a trial week at Coventry City, which did not result in a full-time contract. He had further trials at Charlton Athletic with similar success. On 21 March 2011, he signed a contract with SV Wehen Wiesbaden and joined the club on 30 June 2011. He joined South African club Maritzburg United on 26 June 2012.

International career 
Smeekes made two appearances for the Curaçao national team and four for the Netherlands Antilles national team.

References

External links 
 
 
 Profile at VI 
 
 

1981 births
Living people
Dutch footballers
Dutch people of Curaçao descent
Footballers from Amsterdam
Dutch Antillean footballers
Curaçao footballers
Netherlands Antilles international footballers
Curaçao international footballers
Dutch Antillean expatriate footballers
Curaçao expatriate footballers
Expatriate footballers in Germany
Association football forwards
3. Liga players
FC Volendam players
SC Telstar players
TOP Oss players
Helmond Sport players
Go Ahead Eagles players
Stuttgarter Kickers players
FC Carl Zeiss Jena players
SV Wehen Wiesbaden players
Maritzburg United F.C. players
FC Den Bosch players
WKE players
Expatriate soccer players in South Africa
Flevo Boys players